The women's beach volleyball tournament at the 2010 Asian Games was held from November 15 to November 23, 2010 in Guangzhou, China.

During the preliminary round, in case of a tie between three teams in the pools the top ranked team was determined by the points ratios in the matches between the three tied teams. The second ranked team was determined by the head-to-head match result between the two remaining teams.

Schedule
All times are China Standard Time (UTC+08:00)

Results

Preliminary

Pool A

Pool B

Pool C

Pool D

Knockout round

Final standing

References

Results

External links
Official website

Beach Women